The Richter Glacier is a low gradient coastal glacier located  west of the Scott Nunataks on the northern side of Edward VII Peninsula. The feature saddles with the Butler Glacier and flows north-west to the sea where it forms a small tongue. The glacier and tongue are depicted on the map of the Byrd Antarctic Expedition, 1928–30. The map indicates that the landing party from the Kainan Maru (Shirase) traversed up this glacier to the summit of the Scott Nunataks in January 1912. The glacier was mapped in detail by the United States Geological Survey (USGS) from ground surveys and US Navy aerial photographs, 1959–65. It was named by the Advisory Committee on Antarctic Names (US-ACAN) for Gregory S. Richter, meteorologist-in-charge and scientific leader of the Byrd Station winter party in 1968.

See also
 List of glaciers in the Antarctic
 Glaciology

References

 

Glaciers of King Edward VII Land